El Mundo del Plan B: Los Que la Montan (English: The World of Plan B: The One's Who Get It Done) is the debut studio album by Puerto Rican duo Plan B. It features many collaborations with reggaeton artists.

Track listing
Credits adapted from Apple Music.

References

2002 debut albums
Plan B (duo) albums